The World of Lola Dutronic is the debut album by Canadian electronic music duo Lola Dutronic, released in 2004.

"Ma Jeunesse Fout Le Camp" is a remix of a song by Françoise Hardy, while "La Maritza" is a song written by Pierre Delanoë for French singer Sylvie Vartan.

Track listing

2004 albums
Lola Dutronic albums
Bongo Beat Records albums